DE-CIX Marseille, is a carrier and data center-neutral internet exchange point (IX or IXP) in Marseille, France, founded in 2015 by DE-CIX.

The exchange is located in the carrier-neutral Interxion data center in Marseille.

See also 
 List of Internet exchange points

References 

Internet exchange points in France
Telecommunications in France
Internet in France